Paolo Matthew Serrano (born August 17, 1987), more widely known  as Paolo Serrano is a television and film actor in the Philippines. His film debut was in the indie film Matthew, Mark, Luke and John but mainly gained his fame when he got a role in Green Paradise released in 2007 and  into Joel Lamangan's film Heavenly Touch which limited released in 2009.

Life and career 
His career in entertainment started in 2005 He first starred in an indie film Matthew, Mark, Luke and John   until GMA Network discovered his potential in acting. He debuted in television when he became one of the members of the cast of Daisy Siete: Isala Chikita which aired on GMA-7. He got a cameo role in Tope Lee's Quija a horror movie produced by GMA Films and released in 2007, he was also cast as David in Green Paradise co-star with Cristine Reyes. In 2008 Serrano had as a recurring role of Babangon Ako't Dudurugin Kita, a remake of a Sharon Cuneta movie, which aired on GMA Network. He starred in Joel Lamangan's film Heavenly Touch with Joash Balejado, and Marco Morales in a lead role. He also joined the cast of Una Kang Naging Akin which is also a remake flicks series. In 2009 Serrano appeared as a guest star in ABS-CBN television drama Tayong Dalawa in three episodes.

On December 23, 2009 Serrano signed with ABS-CBN to star as a major recurring character in suspense drama Kung Tayo'y Magkakalayo which premiered on January 18, 2010. The show ran until July 9, 2010 consisting in 121 episodes.

Serrano recently seen in Television remake of Mara Clara portraying as Fidel Montalban aired on ABS-CBN.
 
In 2011 Serrano was supposed to pick up by GMA-7's  new epic series Amaya but he turned down the project offer due to his ongoing commitment on ABS-CBN. He is now one of the supporting actor in the fantasy series Mutya created by Pablo S. Gomez.

Television

Movies

References

External links 
 

1987 births
Living people
Filipino male television actors
Filipino male film actors
Filipino male models
Star Magic
People from Makati
Male actors from Metro Manila